The 2013 Virginia 529 College Savings 250 was the 25th stock car race of the 2013 NASCAR Nationwide Series and the 32nd iteration of the event. The race was held on Friday, September 6, 2013, in Richmond, Virginia, at Richmond International Raceway, a 0.75 miles (1.21 km) D-shaped oval. The race took the scheduled 250 laps to complete. At race's end, Brad Keselowski, driving for Penske Racing, would pass eventual second-place finisher, Richard Childress Racing driver Brian Scott late in the race to win his 25th career NASCAR Nationwide Series win and his fifth win of the season. To fill out the podium, Regan Smith of JR Motorsports finished third.

Background 

Richmond International Raceway (RIR) is a 3/4-mile (1.2 km), D-shaped, asphalt race track located just outside Richmond, Virginia in Henrico County. It hosts the Monster Energy NASCAR Cup Series and Xfinity Series. Known as "America's premier short track", it formerly hosted a NASCAR Camping World Truck Series race, an IndyCar Series race, and two USAC sprint car races.

Entry list 

 (R) denotes rookie driver.
 (i) denotes driver who is ineligible for series driver points.

Practice 
The only two-hour and 30-minute practice session took place on Friday, September 6, at 9:00 AM EST.

Qualifying 
Qualifying was held on Friday, September 6, at 4:05 PM EST. Each driver would have two laps to set a fastest time; the fastest of the two would count as their official qualifying lap.

Five drivers would fail to qualify: Danny Efland, Carl Long, Morgan Shepherd, Derrike Cope, and Brett Butler.

Full qualifying results

Race results

Standings after the race 

Drivers' Championship standings

Note: Only the first 10 positions are included for the driver standings.

References 

2013 NASCAR Nationwide Series
NASCAR races at Richmond Raceway
September 2013 sports events in the United States
2013 in sports in Virginia